On 1 January 2021, 22 years old Usama Nadeem Satti was shot dead by Pakistan's Anti-Terrorism Squad (ATS) personnel in the G-10/4 area between Friday and Saturday night.

Protest
Satti's family and a large number of students protested in front of the National Press Club. Protestors demanded punishment of the culprits and Satti's parents called on Prime Minister Imran Khan to ensure a fair investigation.

Joint Investigation Team 
The Joint Investigation Team (JIT) has confirmed that Osama Nadeem Satti was killed by Islamabad capital police officials.

See also
List of unsolved murders

References

2021 deaths
2021 in Pakistan
2021 murders in Pakistan
Deaths by firearm in Pakistan
Deaths by person in Pakistan
Human rights abuses in Pakistan
Islamabad
Islamabad Capital Territory
January 2021 events in Pakistan
Male murder victims
Police brutality in Asia
Unsolved murders in Pakistan